"Thief" is a song by Canadian alternative rock group Our Lady Peace. It was released in March 2000 as the fourth and final single from their third album Happiness... Is Not a Fish That You Can Catch.

Content
Vocalist Raine Maida has stated that the song was written about a young girl from Kitchener, Ontario that he knew named Mina Kim who was diagnosed with a cancerous tumor in her brain. The "thief" mentioned in the song refers to the tumor. The short clip at the end of the song consisting of a young girl singing a Sunday school song is a real audio clip of Mina Kim singing "Little By Little" with Maida's wife Chantal Kreviazuk and drummer Jeremy Taggart.

Music video
Micha Dahan directed the music video. It was filmed on a rooftop in the St. James Town neighbourhood, downtown Toronto. It premiered on Muchmusic on May 23. It was shot entirely under a rainy setting on an otherwise sunny day, to impose the mood given by the song. Band members do not play instruments and are shown in slow motion film stock in the rain. The video starts off with the band name and song title and then a statement reading “Each year, terminal illness steals the lives of thousands of children. Mina Kim was one”.

Chart performance

References

External links
Lyrics of the song and discussion

Rock ballads
Our Lady Peace songs
Songs written by Raine Maida
Songs written by Jeremy Taggart
Columbia Records singles
Songs about diseases and disorders

2000 singles
2000 songs
Songs about cancer